Lambdavirus (synonyms Lambda-like viruses, Lambda-like phages, Lambda phage group, Lambda phage) is a genus of viruses in the order Caudovirales, in the family Siphoviridae. Bacteria serve as natural hosts, with transmission achieved through passive diffusion. There are five species in this genus. The genus also includes several unclassified viruses—including the corynephages β and ω, which infect Corynebacterium diphtheriae and carry the deadly diphtheria toxin.

Taxonomy
The following species are recognized:
 Enterobacteria virus O276
 Escherichia virus DE3
 Escherichia virus HK629
 Escherichia virus HK630
 Escherichia virus Lambda

Structure
Lambdaviruses are nonenveloped, with a head and tail. The head is about 60 nm in diameter, consisting of 72 capsomers (T=7, levo).

Genome
All species have been fully sequenced. They range between 42k and 49k nucleotides, with 56 to 73 proteins.

Life cycle
The virus attaches to the host cell's adhesion receptors using its terminal fiber, and ejects the viral DNA into the host cytoplasm via long flexible tail ejection system. Viral replication is cytoplasmic. Replication follows the replicative transposition model. DNA-templated transcription is the method of transcription. Translation takes place by -1 ribosomal frameshifting, and +1 ribosomal frameshifting. Once the viral genes have been replicated, the procapsid is assembled and packed. The tail is then assembled and the mature virions are released via lysis, and  holin/endolysin/spanin proteins.
Bacteria serve as the natural host. Transmission routes are passive diffusion.

History
According to ICTV's first report in 1971, the genus Lambdalikevirus was first accepted under the name Lambda phage, unassigned to order, family, or subfamily. In the second report (1975), the genus was renamed to Lambda phage group. Upon its creation in 1984, the genus was assigned to family Siphoviridae. In 1995, ICTV's sixth report once again changed the genus' name, this time to Lambda-like phages. The whole family was moved to the newly created order Caudovirales in 1998, and the genus was renamed to Lambda-like viruses in ICTV's seventh report in 1999. In 2012, the genus was renamed again, to Lambdalikevirus. The genus was later renamed to Lambdavirus.

References

External links
 Viralzone: Lambdalikevirus
 ICTV

Siphoviridae
Virus genera